Famenin (also Romanized as Fāmenīn, Fāmanīn, and Famīnīn) is a city and capital of Famenin County, Hamadan Province, Iran. At the 2006 census, its population was 14,019, in 3,634 families.

References

Populated places in Famenin County

Cities in Hamadan Province